Tessa Davidson (born 1969) is an English snooker player from Banbury, Oxfordshire. She won a number of ranking titles on the World Ladies Billiards and Snooker Association circuit.

Biography
In 1989, Davidson won the UK Championship. In 1991 she won the Western Women's Championship and the Pontins Ladies' Bowl.

Later in 1991, Davidson made a women's world record break of 135 at the British Open.

In 1992 she joined the World Professional Billiards and Snooker Association and competed in events on the professional circuit for the 1992–93 season.

Following a break of some three years from playing, Davidson started competing again and reached the final of the Regal Welsh Open.

She went on to win the 1998 UK Championship, winning 4–1 in the final against Kelly Fisher after losing the first frame. In the semi-finals, Karen Corr lost her match with Davidson by going in-off the final black in the deciding frame. At this time, outside snooker, Davidson was operating a mobile fish and chip shop with her husband.

Davidson returned to the tournament circuit for the 2021–22 snooker season. She won the seniors (over-40) women's world championship, losing only one frame in four matches.

Titles and achievements

WLBSA Events

Team Events
1992 Home International Series winner, with Kim Shaw. (The tournament was played as a round-robin against teams from Northern Ireland, Scotland, Wales, Republic of Ireland and Isle of Man)

References

External links
Tessa Davidson at World Women's Snooker
Tessa Davidson at WPBSA SnookerScores

1969 births
Living people
Female snooker players
English snooker players
Sportspeople from Banbury